Peter Weimer Davison (May 15, 1869 – February 12, 1920) was an American brigadier general during World War I.

Early life and education 
Peter Davison was born on his family's farm near Waupun, Wisconsin on May 15, 1869. He attended the United States Military Academy, graduating with the class of 1892. During his time at the United States Military Academy, he helped found and played on the Academy's football team. His fellow classmates included numerous men who would later attain general officer rank, such as Charles Pelot Summerall, Tracy Campbell Dickson, Frank W. Coe, William Ruthven Smith, James Ancil Shipton, Louis Chapin Covell, Preston Brown, George Blakely, Robert Mearns, Julian Robert Lindsey, Howard Russell Hickok, Henry Howard Whitney, John E. Woodward, John McAuley Palmer and George Columbus Barnhardt.

Military career 
As a second lieutenant, Davison served in the 22nd Infantry Regiment.  He served in Montana from 1892 to 1896 and in Nebraska from 1896 to 1898. In 1899, he served in the Philippines with his regiment. Davison advanced through the ranks and was appointed to the rank of colonel on August 5, 1917. Davison commanded the 8th Infantry to September 1918. From October 1918 through February 1919, he commanded the 16th Division. From February 1919 to May 1919, he commanded Fort D. A. Russell in Cheyenne, Wyoming. In May 1919, he was assigned as executive officer of the Hoboken, New Jersey Port of Embarkation. he received the Navy Cross for his World War I service.

Personal life 
Davison was a Freemason and an Episcopalian.

Davison married Mary Adele Casey, the daughter of Colonel James Casey, on September 9, 1896. She died in 1898. Davison married Esther Fleming on April 11, 1913.

Death and legacy 
Davison died at a hospital on Staten Island, New York on February 12, 1920. He was buried at Forest Mound Cemetery in Waupun.

References 

1869 births
1920 deaths
People from Waupun, Wisconsin
Military personnel from Wisconsin
United States Military Academy alumni
United States Army generals
American football running backs
Burials in Wisconsin
United States Army generals of World War I
American military personnel of the Spanish–American War
United States Army Infantry Branch personnel